Peter Aitken (born 11 November 1934) is a former Australian rules footballer who played with Carlton in the Victorian Football League (VFL).

References 

 Cardosi .A. (June 2012).Australia Football. Retrieved from: https://australianfootball.com/players/player/peter%2Baitken/8486 
 Stats-Statistics-AFL tables. Retrieved from : https://afltables.com/afl/stats/players/P/Peter_Aitken.html
 VFL (24/06/2016) Retrieved from: https://www.nswfootballhistory.com.au/tag/vfl/page/2/
 Boyles Football PhotosBoyles. Football PhotosResearch and Pathways to Victoria's Football History 1925-65. Retrieved from: http://www.boylesfootballphotos.net.au/Peter+Aitken
 Australian Football Club. Kyabram Bombers Football Club. Retrieved from: https://aflnational.com/vic/country/goulburn-valley/kyabram-bombers/

External links 

Peter Aitken's profile at Blueseum

1934 births
Carlton Football Club players
Living people
Australian rules footballers from Victoria (Australia)
Kyabram Football Club players